The New York Titans were a professional lacrosse team based in the New York metropolitan area. The team was a member of the Eastern Division of the National Lacrosse League from 2006 to 2009. On August 11, 2009, the National Lacrosse League confirmed that the franchise would relocate to Orlando, Florida and become the Orlando Titans.

In their three seasons in the NLL, the Titans alternated their home games between several sporting venues. During the 2007 season, the Titans played four of their eight home games at Madison Square Garden, and the other four at Nassau Veterans Memorial Coliseum.  For the 2008 season, the team played all of its home games at Madison Square Garden, while playing one game at a neutral site at the Sovereign Bank Arena in Trenton, NJ. In 2009, the Titans' home schedule consisted of two games at the Garden, five games at the Prudential Center in Newark, New Jersey and one game at the BankAtlantic Center in Florida.

History
In 2006, the NLL announced the league's expansion into the New York and Chicago markets with New York's ownership group being composed of principal owner Gary Rosenbach and including William E. Ford, Mark H. Ford, Nick Leone, Flip Huffard and Richard Ullmann.  The announcement marked the return of the NLL to the New York after the demise of the New York Saints. On September 13, 2006, following an online poll, the franchise was dubbed the New York Titans. The Titans home games would be played at Madison Square Garden and Nassau Veterans Memorial Coliseum.

Inaugural season

On January 6, 2007, the Titans played their first franchise game against their fellow expansion team Shamrox in Chicago, Illinois. Gewas Schindler scored the first goal in the team's history; however, the Shamrox defeated the Titans 15–12. Following a two-game losing streak, the Titans defeated the Shamrox 11–9 for their first franchise and home victory. The game also marked the first lacrosse game to be played in Madison Square Garden's history. The team completed the season in last place with a 4-12 record. Following the 2006–2007 season, Daniel resigned as Team President and Governor and Timothy Kelly was named the team's new Chief Operating Officer.

2008 season

After opening the 2008 season with a 1-4 record, the Titans rebounded and ended the season with a 10-6 record. The team finished in a four-way tie for the best record in the league with Buffalo, Minnesota, and Philadelphia. Due to the NLL's tiebreaker rules and procedures, the Titans finished third in the division and league standings, but secured their first playoff berth in franchise history. The Titans advanced to the NLL Eastern Division Final, defeating the Minnesota Swarm 11-8, however, lost 19-12 to eventual Champion's Cup-winners the Buffalo Bandits.

Following the season, head coach Adam Mueller was awarded the Les Bartley Award for coach of the year. Mueller soon after announced his retirement from coaching, and former Rochester Knighthawks coach Ed Comeau was hired as the head coach for the 2009 season.

2009 championship runners-up

With new head coach Ed Comeau, the Titans finished on top of the Eastern Division standings with a 10-6 record. They would later defeat the Rochester Knighthawks and returning Champion Cup winners the Buffalo Bandits to advance to the Champion's Cup, The Titans lost 12-10 to the Calgary Roughnecks in the championship game.

All-time record

Awards & honors

Playoff results

Attendance

A - Madison Square Garden, NY. Capacity: 18,200
B - Nassau Coliseum,       NY. Capacity: 16,234
C - Sovereign Bank Arena,  NJ. Capacity: 8,100
D - Prudential Center,     NJ. Capacity: 17,625
E - Sold.                      Game sold to another team.
F - Promotion game.            Played out of the tri-state area.

Draft history

NLL Entry Draft 
First Round Selections

 2006: Brendan Mundorf (11th overall)
 2007: Jordan Hall (1st overall), Mitch Belisle (13th overall) 
 2008: None

See also
 New York Titans seasons
 Orlando Titans

References

Defunct National Lacrosse League teams
Lacrosse teams in New York (state)
Sports in Long Island
Lacrosse clubs established in 2006
Sports clubs disestablished in 2009
2006 establishments in New York (state)
2009 disestablishments in New York (state)